"Where'd You Learn How to Do That" is a song recorded by Canadian country artist Dean Brody. The song was written by Jenna Walker and Stuart Walker of the Reklaws, along with Blake Redferrin and Tawgs Salter.

Background
Brody released "Where'd You Learn How to Do That" ahead of a slate of summer 2022 tour dates, remarking that it had "been a while" since he had a song "that brings a party like this one does".

Brody's fellow country artists and friends Stuart and Jenna Walker of the sibling duo the Reklaws co-wrote the track with Thomas "Tawgs" Salter and Blake Redferrin. Stuart Walker remarked that when they originally finished the song, Redferrin sang it with his usual "Southern drawl", which led Walker to realize that Brody would have a more suitable voice for the song. Knowing that Brody was looking for new songs, they passed it along through their manager.

Critical reception
Nanci Dagg of Canadian Beats Media  referred to the song as "a fun, upbeat track showing off [Brody's] country roots".

Charts

References

2022 songs
2022 singles
Dean Brody songs
Songs written by Jenna Walker
Songs written by Stuart Walker (singer)
Songs written by Blake Redferrin
Song recordings produced by Todd Clark
Songs written by Tawgs Salter